Atrak Air was a scheduled airline based at Mehrabad International Airport, Tehran, Iran.

History
Atrak Air was founded in 1993 with its headquarters in Ekbatan Town, Tehran, Iran. The airline finally commenced service in 2013 with flights to three destinations with further services being added since.

As of summer 2018, Atrak Air suspended its operations.

Destinations
As of March 2017, Atrak Air flew to the following destinations in Iran:

Fleet

As of August 2017 Atrak Air operated the following aircraft:

See also
 List of airlines of Iran

References

External links

 

2018 disestablishments in Iran
Defunct airlines of Iran
Airlines established in 1993
Airlines disestablished in 2018
Iranian companies established in 1993